Tornbjerg is a village and southeastern suburb of  Odense, in Funen, Denmark.

References

Suburbs of Odense
Populated places in Funen